Molyobka is the name of several rural localities in Perm Krai, Russia:
Molyobka, Beryozovsky District, Perm Krai, a village in Beryozovsky District
Molyobka, Kishertsky District, Perm Krai, a selo in Kishertsky District